The Waimamaku River is a river of the Northland Region of New Zealand's North Island. It flows west from the Mataraua Forest to reach the Tasman Sea eight kilometres south of the mouth of the Hokianga Harbour.

The Waimamaku River begins north of the Waipoua Forest and flows west through Waimamaku township, eventually reaching the west coast south of the Hokianga Harbour. The catchment is 133 square km and is dominated by native forest in the upper reaches. It is mainly pastoral in the lower catchment. The sampling site is located in the lower reaches of the river, after it passes through Waimamaku.

Meaning
Water of Mamaku Fern (Centennial Atlas draft 1941)

See also
List of rivers of New Zealand

References

Land, Air, Water, Aotearora- LAWA Waimamaku River

Far North District
Rivers of the Northland Region
Rivers of New Zealand